Three-Body is a Chinese science fiction television series based on the novel The Three-Body Problem by Liu Cixin. The series premiered on January 15, 2023.

Premise
In 2007, Wang Miao – one of China's leading nanomaterials experts is enlisted by Shi Qiang, a detective who specializes in counterterrorism, in the case of strange apparent suicides in the scientific community. During the investigation, Wang Miao encounters a mysterious organization called the Frontiers of Science and proceeds to learn the truth behind how an alien world depicted in a popular video game connects with the apparent suicides and the fate of the world.

Cast
 Zhang Luyi as Wang Miao
 Yu Hewei as Shi Qiang
 Chen Jin and Wang Ziwen as Ye Wenjie
 Lin Yongjian as General Chang Weisi
 Li Xiaoran as Shen Yufei
 Eric Wang as Ding Yi
 Kou Zhenhai as Ye Zhetai
 He Dujuan as Yang Dong
 Kenan Heppe as Mike Evans
 Mike Koltes as Colonel Mike Williams

Production
Although Tencent obtained the rights to the novels in 2008, attempts to produce a Chinese live-action adaptation of the novels began in earnest in 2015 with The Three-Body Problem film by YooZoo Film. Filming lasted for 5 months in 2015, but the final product was never released. While YooZoo Film struck a deal in September 2020 to produce their own adaptation for  Netflix with Game of Thrones creators David Benioff and D. B. Weiss at the helm, work on the script for a Chinese adaptation was already underway at Tencent and took four years to complete. Shooting began in July 2020 and lasted 126 days. The Beijing Electron–Positron Collider II doubled for the particle accelerator in the series.

In November 2021, a trailer for the series was released with no specific premiere date. This was followed by a second trailer in June 2022, and a final trailer 3 days prior to the premiere.
After several delays, the series began airing on January 15, 2023, with the first 4 episodes available for streaming on WeTV and Rakuten Viki.

Episodes

Reception
Three-Body has received wide acclaim in China. On Douban, the series received a score of 8.5. Viewers praised the overall production quality, the faithfulness of the adaptation and the casting. Many compared it favorably with the similarly-named animation series. Domestic critics praised the visual effects as astonishing.

In the United States, The New York Times critic Mike Hale noted that series was faithful to the original text, with logical adaptations made to suit television. However, he described the screenplay and cast as mediocre, and the game scenes not as vivid as the original.

References

External links
 
 
 
 Three-Body 30 episode series on Rakuten Vicki (English subtitles)

Alien invasions in television
Television shows based on Chinese novels
Television shows filmed in China
2023 Chinese television series debuts